Cavalry Command (also known as The Day of the Trumpet)  is a 1958 Filipino-American Western film directed by Eddie Romero and starring  John Agar and Richard Arlen.

Plot

Cast  
  John Agar  as  Sgt. Judd Norcutt 
  Richard Arlen  as  Sgt. Jim Heisler
  Myron Healey  as  Lt. Worth
  William Phipps  as  Pvt. Steve Haines 
  Alicia Vergel  as  Laura
  Pancho Magalona  as  Captain Magno Maxalla
   Eddie Infante   as  San Pascual's Priest
   Cielito Legaspi  as  Clara
   Roy Planas   as  Tibo Maxalla 
  Vic Diaz  as Julio

References

External links

1958 Western (genre) films
1958 films
American Western (genre) films
Philippine drama films
Films directed by Eddie Romero
Films set in the Philippines
Films set during the Philippine–American War
1950s English-language films
1950s American films